Cratoavis is a genus of enantiornithines. The type and only currently described species is C. cearensis, from the Early Cretaceous of Araripe Basin, Ceará, Brazil. The fossil, an articulated skeleton with feathers attached to the wings and surrounding the body, extends considerably the temporal record of the group at South America.

The genus was named after the Crato Formation, in which the specimen was found.

References

Euenantiornitheans
Aptian life
Early Cretaceous dinosaurs of South America
Cretaceous Brazil
Fossils of Brazil
 
Fossil taxa described in 2015
Taxa named by Fernando Novas